The Atayal language is spoken by the Atayal people of Taiwan. Squliq and C’uli’ (Ts’ole’) are two major dialects. Mayrinax and Pa’kuali’, two subdialects of C’uli’, are unique among Atayal dialects in having male and female register distinctions in their vocabulary.

History

Several works on the language, including several reference grammars, have been published. In 1980 an Atayal–English dictionary was published by Søren Egerod. The Bible has been translated into Atayal and was published in 2002. Atayal was one of the source languages of Yilan Creole Japanese.

In April 2020 an Atayal language Wikipedia was launched following efforts by Taiwan's Ministry of Education and National Chengchi University to promote the written use of Taiwan's Aboriginal languages.

Dialects

Atayal dialects can be classified under two dialects groups: Squliq and C’uli’ (Ts’ole’).

Orthography
The Atayal language is most commonly written in the Latin script; a standard orthography for the language was established by the Taiwanese government in 2005. In writing,  represents the velar nasal , and the apostrophe  represents the glottal stop.

In some dialects but not all, schwa /ə/ is frequently omitted in writing, resulting in long consonant clusters on the surface (e.g. pspngun ).

The pronunciation of certain letters differs from the IPA conventions.

Phonology

Dialects differ slightly in their phonology. Presented below are the vowel and consonant inventories of Mayrinax Atayal (Huang 2000a). Orthographic conventions are added in ⟨angle brackets⟩.

Vowels

Consonants

Most of these sounds are also encountered in other Formosan languages, but the velar fricative [] is a trade mark of Atayalic languages. This sound has restricted distribution, though, as it never occurs in word-initial position.

Even though some literature includes a glottal fricative in the consonant inventory, that phoneme is phonetically realized as a pharyngeal (Li 1980), which is true for Atayalic languages in general. The alveolar fricative and affricate are palatalized before [] and [], rendering [] and [], respectively (Lu 2005), as in the Sinitic contact languages Mandarin Chinese and Taiwanese Hokkien.

Plngawan Atayal (a subdialect of Ci'uli') differs from this inventory in that it lacks a schwa, and that there are two phonemic rhotics (Shih 2008).

Squliq Atayal has a voiced alveo-palatal fricative [] (Li 1980), but Huang 2015 doubts its phonemicity, arguing that it is an allophone of [].

Grammar

Verbs
Mayrinax Atayal (a Cʔuliʔ dialect spoken in Tai'an Township, Miaoli County) has a four-way focus system (Huang 2000b).

 Agent focus (AF)
 Patient focus (PF)
 Locative focus (LF)
 Instrumental/Beneficiary focus (IF/BF)

The following list of focus markers are used in Mayrinax Atayal.
 Agent focus (AF)
 Realis: m-, -um- (more dynamic); ma-, ø (less dynamic / more stative)
 Irrealis: m-, ma-, -um- ... -ay (projective/immediate); pa- (future)
 Patient focus (PF)
 Realis: -un (neutral), ø (perfective)
 Irrealis: -aw (projective/immediate); -un (future)
 Locative focus (LF)
 Realis: -an
 Irrealis: -ay (projective/immediate); -an (future)
 Instrumental/Beneficiary focus (IF/BF)
 Realis: si-
 Irrealis: -anay (projective/immediate); ø (future)

Aspect markers include:
 -in-: perfective
 pa-: irrealis (also serves as a causative marker)
 kiaʔ and haniʔan: progressive

Other verbal markers include:
 ka-: stative marker
 i-: locative marker
 ø- (null marker): agent-focus imperative

Dynamic and stative verbal prefixes run along a continuum. Here, they are listed from most dynamic to most stative.
 m-, -um-
 ma1-, ø1
 ma-2
 ø2

Case markers
Mayrinax Atayal has an elaborate case marking system. The Mayrinax case markers below are sourced from Huang (2002).

Wulai Atayal (a Squliq Atayal dialect spoken in Wulai District, New Taipei City) has a much simpler case-marking system (Huang 1995).

Pronouns
The Mayrinax and Wulai Atayal personal pronouns below are sourced from Huang (1995). In both varieties, the nominative and genitive forms are bound while the neutral and locative ones are free (unbound).

Affixes
The following list of Mayrinax Atayal affixes is sourced from the Comparative Austronesian Dictionary (1995).
 Note: Some affixes are unglossed.

Verbal prefixes
 ma- 'stative'
 ma- 'active'
 man-
 mana-
 maɣ-
 ma-ša- 'reciprocal, mutual'
 ma-ši 'natural release or movement'
 pana-
 ma-ti-
 ʔi-
 pa- 'causative'
 ši- 'benefactive'
 ga- 'verbalizer'
 kan- + RED + N (body parts) 'body movement'
 ma-ka- 'mutual, reciprocal'
 maki- 'active verb'
 mat- 'to turn'
 mi-
 paš-
 ta- ... -an 'location'
 tiɣi- 'to release gas'
 tu- 'for some to ... '

Verbal infixes
 -um- 'agent focus'
 -in- 'completive'

Verbal suffixes
 -an 'locative focus'
 -un 'object focus'
 -i 'imperative'
 -aw 'future or mild request'
 -ani 'polite request'

Nominal affixes
 -in- 'nominalizer'
 -in- ... -an 'nominalizer to indicate a completed action'

 Male affixes (i.e., male forms of speech in Mayrinax Atayal) include (Comparative Austronesian Dictionary): -niḳ, -iḳ, -ʔiŋ, -hiŋ, -iŋ, -tiŋ, -riʔ, -ḳiʔ, -niʔ, -nux, -ux, -hu, -u, -al, -liʔ, -kaʔ, -ha, -il, -in-, -il-, -i-, -a-, -na-.

See also
 Yilan Creole Japanese

Notes

References

 
 
 
 
 
  – Describes Squliq Atayal.
 
 

Mayrinax Atayal
  – Describes Mayrinax Atayal

External links

 Rosetta Project: Atayal Swadesh list
 Ci'uli Atayal Wordlist at the Austronesian Basic Vocabulary Database
 Yuánzhùmínzú yǔyán xiànshàng cídiǎn 原住民族語言線上詞典  – Atayal search page at the "Aboriginal language online dictionary" website of the Council of Indigenous Peoples of Taiwan

Atayal culture
Atayalic languages